The White House Police Force was a security police force formed in 1922 to protect the White House and the President of the United States. It became part of the United States Secret Service in 1930. It was renamed the Executive Protective Service in 1970 and then the Uniformed Division of the Secret Service in 1977.

History

The White House Police Force was created on October 1, 1922, at the request of President Warren G. Harding to provide police and security services to the White House and Executive Office Building. Initially the President or his appointed representative supervised the force.

The White House Police Force was placed under the command of the Chief of the United States Secret Service in 1930. In 1970, it became the Executive Protective Service and its roles and size were expanded. Its responsibilities now included the protection of the White House, foreign missions in and around Washington, D.C., and the Naval Observatory. Together they provide protection for the following: The President and Vice President of the United States and their immediate families, presidential candidates, the White House Complex, the Vice President's Residence, and foreign diplomatic missions in the Washington, D.C., metropolitan area.

The Executive Protective Service became the Uniformed Division of the Secret Service in 1977. When the United States Treasury Police was merged into the Uniformed Division of the Secret Service in 1986 it became responsible for the main Treasury building and the Treasury Annex building, both of which are adjacent to the White House.

Fallen officer

Since the establishment of the White House Police, one officer has died in the line of duty.

See also

 List of United States federal law enforcement agencies
 Federal Police

References

Bibliography

 Donald A. Torres (1985). Handbook of Federal Police and Investigative Agencies. Greenwood Press.  and 

 
Protective security units
1922 establishments in Washington, D.C.
Defunct federal law enforcement agencies of the United States
1977 disestablishments in Washington, D.C.